Trident High School is a state coeducational secondary school located in Whakatāne, New Zealand. The school opened in February 1973 as the town's second secondary school, alongside Whakatane High School. Serving Years 9 to 13 (ages 12 to 18), the school has a roll of  students as of

Notable alumni

Monica Falkner — New Zealand international netball player
Kane Hames - All Black
Sarah Walker (attended c. 2002–06) – BMX rider, Olympic silver medallist (2012 London)

References

External links

Secondary schools in the Bay of Plenty Region
Educational institutions established in 1973
Whakatāne